X Factor is a television music talent show in Kazakhstan contested by aspiring pop singers drawn from public auditions. It is the Kazakh version of the international The X Factor series and is broadcast on the Perviy Kanal Evraziya channel in Kazakhstan.

Judges' categories and their contestants
In each season, each judge is allocated a category to mentor and chooses three acts to progress to the live shows. This table shows, for each season, which category each judge was allocated and which acts he or she put through to the live shows.

Key:
 – Winning judge/category. Winners are in bold, eliminated contestants in small font.

Season summary 
 "Sultana Karazhigitova" category
 "Alexander Shevchenko" category
 "Nagima Eskalieva" category
 "Ismail Igilmanov" category
 "Erlan Kokeev" category
 "Dilnaz Akhmadieva" category
 "Nurbergen Makhambetov" category
 "Eva Becher" category
 "Anatoliy Tsoy" category

Season 1 (2011)
The first season was aired from January to May 2011 with Nagima Eskalieva, Sultana Karazhigitova and Alexander Shevchenko as judges. On 22 May, Daria Gabdull (Дәрия Ғабдұлл), labeled by the judges as the "Kazakh Beyoncé, won the show ahead of the trio Spasibo. Gabdulla won a two-years-contract with Sony Music.

Season 2 (2012)
The second season was aired from January to May 2012 with Nagima Eskalieva, Sultana Karazhigitova/Ismail Igilmanov and Alexander Shevchenko as judges. On 5 May, Andrei Tikhonov (Андрей Тихонов) won the show ahead of the quartet Mezzo. Andrey won a two-years-contract with Sony Music.

Season 3 (Winter/Spring 2013)
The third season was aired from January to May 2013 with Nagima Eskalieva, Erlan Kokeev and Alexander Shevchenko as judges. On 4 May, Evgenia Barysheva (Евгения Барышева) won the show ahead of the Arman Kamerdinov (Арман Камердинов).

Season 4 (Fall 2013)
The fourth season was aired from 14 September to 7 December 2013 with Nagima Eskalieva, Dilnaz Akhmadieva and Alexander Shevchenko as judges. On 7 December, Kairat Kapanov (Кайрат Капанов) won the show ahead of the Alexandra Samarina (Александра Самарина)

Season 5 (2014)
The fifth season was aired from 6 September to 27 December 2014 with Nagima Eskalieva, Dilnaz Akhmadieva/Nurbergen Makhambetov and Alexander Shevchenko as judges.

Season 6 (2015)
The sixth season was aired from 5 September to 26 December 2015 with Nagima Eskalieva, Nurbergen Makhambetov and Eva Becher as judges.

Season 7 (2018)
The seventh season was aired from 1 September to 30 December 2018 with Nagima Eskalieva, Dilnaz Akhmadieva and Nurbergen Makhambetov as judges.

Season 8 (2020-21)
The eighth season was aired from 24 October 2020 to 20 February 2021 with Nagima Eskalieva, Anatoliy Tsoy and Nurbergen Makhambetov as judges.

See also 
 SuperStar KZ

References

External links
 Official website

Kazakhstani television shows
Television series by Fremantle (company)
Kazakhstan
2011 Kazakhstani television series debuts
Non-British television series based on British television series
2010s Kazakhstani television series
Channel One Eurasia original programming